Coiled-coil domain-containing protein 55 is a protein that in humans is encoded by the CCDC55 gene. It is now known as nuclear speckle splicing regulatory protein 1. The HGNC approved gene name is NSRP1.

NSRP1 is located within nuclear speckles. Speckles are dynamic membrane-less organelles within the nucleus and are rich in RNA splicing factors. NSRP1 interacts with other splicing factors including SRSF1 and SRSF2 and modulates pre-mRNA splicing. Knockout of the mouse ortholog Nsrp1 resulted in early embryonic lethality.

Humans with biallelic pathogenic variants in NSRP1 have an autosomal recessive condition called neurodevelopmental disorder with spasticity, seizures, and brain abnormalities (NEDSSBA, MIM 620001). Affected individuals have delayed developmental milestones, axial hypotonia, appendicular spasticity, epilepsy, and often microcephaly. Brain abnormalities including under-opercularization, cerebellar atrophy, and thinning of the corpus callosum can be seen. Patients with NEDSSBA often have a clinical diagnosis of spastic cerebral palsy (CP), and thus NEDSSBA should be considered a CP disease gene.

References

External links

Further reading